Equus scotti (translated from Latin as Scott's horse, named after vertebrate paleontologist William Berryman Scott) is an extinct species of Equus, the genus that includes the horse. Equus scotti was native to North America.

Evolution
 
 
E. scotti likely evolved from earlier, more zebra-like North American equids early in the Pleistocene epoch. The species may have crossed from North America to Eurasia over the Bering land bridge during the Pleistocene.  The species died out at the end of the last ice age in the large-scale Pleistocene extinction of megafauna.

It was among the last of the native horse species in the Americas until the reintroduction of the horse approximately 10,000 years later, when conquistadors brought modern horses to North and South America around the 16th century.

Distribution
Paleontological excavations have identified the locations of numerous places where E. scotti occurred. The species was named from Rock Creek, Texas, United States, where multiple skeletons were recovered. A closely related fossil find was made of Equus bautistensis in California; this species appeared closely related, but of a slightly more primitive form than E. scotti.  However, E. bautistensis was redefined as a junior synonym of E. scotti in 1998 by paleontologist E. Scott, who also assigned fossils from the Anza-Borrego Desert in California, tentatively interpreted to represent E. bautistensis, to E. scotti. One of the reported locations farthest south in the Americas is Pali Aike National Park in Chile.

See also
Equus lambei
Evolution of the horse

References

Pliocene horses
Prehistoric mammals of North America
Pleistocene horses
Pliocene first appearances
Pleistocene species extinctions
Pleistocene mammals of North America
Fossil taxa described in 1900
Equus (genus)